The Slovenian Futsal Cup, currently named Pokal Terme Olimia due to the sponsorship reasons, is the top knockout tournament of Slovenian futsal and the second most important futsal competition in Slovenia after the Slovenian Futsal League. It is organized by the Football Association of Slovenia and was established in the 1995–96 season. The cup is contested by 16 clubs. Since 2013, the Final 4 tournament has been held in Podčetrtek.

The most successful team of the competition is Litija with nine titles. They are followed by Dobovec who won six titles, and Puntar and Oplast Kobarid with three titles each. Luvin Maribor and Brezje, both from Maribor, have won two titles each, while Celje, Gorica and Bronx Škofije have won one title each.

Finals

By season

By titles

See also
 Slovenian Futsal League

References

External links
 Slovenian Futsal Cup at NZS 

   
Futsal competitions in Slovenia
1995 establishments in Slovenia
National futsal cups